Domenico Serra (1899–1965) was an Italian stage and film actor. He made more than sixty films, many of them during the silent era including Mario Bonnard's historical film The Betrothed (1923). In the sound era, he largely played supporting or minor roles.

Partial filmography

 Il tesoro della cattedrale (1915)
 Il diamante azzurro (1916)
 Il germoglio della morte (1916)
 La trovata del brasiliano (1916)
 L'apostolo (1916)
 The Cavalcade of Dreams (1917)
 Wanda Warenine (1917)
 Sorrisi e spasimi della menzogna (1917)
 Maternità (1917)
 Le due orfanelle di Torino (1917)
 I raggi 'Z''' (1917)
 Il rifugio dell'alba (1918)
 Il marito dell'amica (1919)
 Le labbra e il cuore (1919)
 La maestrina (1919)
 Il buon Samaritano (1919)
 Il mistero della casa di fronte (1919)
 Federica d'Illiria (1919)
 Il ventriloquo (1920)
 Il marito in campagna (1920)
 The Shadow (1920)
 Il tredicesimo commensale (1921)
 The Painting of Osvaldo Mars (1921) - Osvald Mars, il pittore
 Il tango dei trapassatti (1921)
 L'inafferrabile (1922)
 The Betrothed (1922) - Renzo Tramaglino
 El martirio de vivir (1922)
 Il forzato dell'amore (1923)
 Il capolavoro di Saetta (1923)
 Contro corrente (1923)
 La taverna verde (1924) - Il viveur
 Pleasure Train (1924)
 Chief Saetta (1924)
 Maciste all'inferno (1925) - Giorgio
 Steel (1933)
 La voce senza volto (1939) - L'altro aiutante del regista
 La notte delle beffe (1939)
 Cuori nella tormenta (1940) - Renato
 Piccolo alpino (1940)
 Lucky Night (1941)
 The Betrothed (1941) - Tonio (uncredited)
 Se io fossi onesto (1942) - Il maggiordomo del barone Vareghi
 La fabbrica dell'imprevisto (1942)
 Quelli della montagna (1943) - (uncredited)
 Lo sbaglio di essere vivo (1945)
 O sole mio (1946)
 The Opium Den (1947) - (uncredited)
 I fratelli Karamazoff (1947)
 Lost in the Dark (1947)
 L'ebreo errante (1948)
 Il corriere di ferro (1948)
 Margaret of Cortona (1950)
 The Beggar's Daughter (1950)
 Bellezze in bicicletta (1951)
 Jolanda, the Daughter of the Black Corsair (1953) - Ramon
 The Steel Rope (1954)
 Orphan of the Ghetto (1954)
 The Song of the Heart (1955)
 Canzone proibita (1956) - (final film role)

References

External links

Bibliography
 Goble, Alan. The Complete Index to Literary Sources in Film''. Walter de Gruyter, 1999.

1899 births
1965 deaths
Italian male stage actors
Italian male film actors
Italian male silent film actors
People from Crescentino
20th-century Italian male actors